The Robert Award for Best Costume Design is one of the merit awards presented by the Danish Film Academy at the annual Robert Awards ceremony. The award has been handed out since 1984, except in 1988 and 1991.

Honorees

1980s 
 1984: Annelise Hauberg for 
 1985: Manon Rasmussen for The Element of Crime
 1986: Evelyn Olsson & Jette Termann for 
 1987: Manon Rasmussen for Early Spring
 1988: Not awarded
 1989: Annelise Hauberg for Katinka

1990s 
 1990: Manon Rasmussen for The Miracle in Valby
 1991: Not awarded
 1992: Manon Rasmussen for The Boys from St. Petri
 1993: Jette Termann for Sofie
 1994: Manon Rasmussen for Black Harvest
 1995: Manon Rasmussen for 
 1996: Manon Rasmussen for 
 1997:  for Hamsun
 1998: Manon Rasmussen for Eye of the Eagle
 1999: Ingrid Søe for

2000s 
 2000: Katja Watkins for 
 2001: Louize Nissen for The Bench
 2002: Stine Gudmundsen-Holmgreen for 
 2003: Dominique Borg for I Am Dina
 2004: Manon Rasmussen for Dogville
 2005: Helle Nielsen for King's Game
 2006: Manon Rasmussen for Young Andersen
 2007: Manon Rasmussen for Drømmen
 2008: Margrethe Rasmussen for The Art of Crying
 2009: Manon Rasmussen for Flame & Citron

2010s 
 2010: Anne-Dorte Fischer for 
 2011: Margrethe Rasmussen for Submarino
 2012: Stine Gudmundsen-Holmgreen for Dirch
 2013: Manon Rasmussen for A Royal Affair
 2014: Manon Rasmussen for 
 2015: Manon Rasmussen for Nymphomaniac Director's Cut
 2016:  for The Shamer's Daughter
 2017: Stine Thaning for Der kommer en dag
 2018: Nina Grønlund for Vinterbrødre
 2019: Manon Rasmussen for A Fortunate Man

References

External links 
  

1984 establishments in Denmark
Awards established in 1984
Awards for film costume design
Costume Design